Brunswick stew is a tomato-based stew generally involving local beans, vegetables, and originally small game meat such as squirrel or rabbit, though today often chicken. The exact origin of the stew is disputed. The states of Virginia, North Carolina, and Georgia all claim its birth, with Brunswick County in Virginia and the city of Brunswick in Georgia both claiming it was developed there.  It may have originated earlier in some form in the city of Braunschweig (English: Brunswick) in the  Duchy of Brunswick-Lüneburg in today's northern Germany.

Ingredients
Recipes for Brunswick stew vary greatly, but it is usually a tomato-based stew, containing various types of lima beans (butter beans), corn, okra, and other vegetables, and one or more types of meat. Originally it was small game such as squirrel, rabbit or opossum meat, but chicken is most common today.  Eastern North Carolina Brunswick Stew has potatoes, which thicken it considerably.  Eastern Virginia Brunswick Stew tends to be thinner, with more tomato flavor.

Today chicken and rabbit are more common in Virginia, pork in Georgia, and only in recent years Eastern North Carolina–style pulled pork barbecue may be found there. Many Piedmont-Triad barbecue restaurants include Lexington-style barbecue in the dish.

Squirrel Brunswick stew instructions are found in James Beard's American Cookery.

Origin

The stew's specific origin is unknown.  Brunswick County, Virginia,  and the city of Brunswick, Georgia, both named after the German Duchy of Brunswick-Lüneburg, then home to the House of Hanover which ruled the British throne, claim to have created it.

A plaque on an old iron pot in Brunswick, Georgia, says the first Brunswick stew was made in it on July 2, 1898, on nearby St. Simons Island. A competing story claims a Virginia state legislator's chef invented the recipe in 1828 on a hunting expedition.  Neither claim traces to the origin of those regions.

Marjorie Kinnan Rawlings, in her Cross Creek Cookery (1942), wrote that the stew, said to have been one of Queen Victoria's favorites, may have come from Braunschweig, Germany, one of the historic capitals of the Duchy of Brunswick-Lüneburg and traditionally known as "Brunswick" in British English.

According to the Virginia Writers Project's guide to Virginia, published in 1941, the stew originated in Brunswick County, Virginia:
Native to this county is Brunswick Stew, a flavorous brew first concocted by a group of hunters. One of the party, who had been detailed to stay in the camp as a cook, lazily threw all the supplies into a pot, it is said, and cooked the mixture over a slow fire. When his companions returned, cold and exhausted, they found the concoction a most appetizing dish. The time-honored directions for making this luscious meal are: boil about 9 pounds of game—squirrels are preferred—in 2 gallons of water until tender; add to the rich stock 6 pounds of tomatoes, 1 pound of butter-beans, 6 slices of bacon, 1 red pepper, salt to taste; cook 6 hours and add 6 ears of corn cut from the cob; boil for 8 minutes.

See also

 List of stews

References

External links
A Georgia Brunswick stew recipe
Brunswick stew at New Georgia Encyclopedia

American stews
Cuisine of the Southern United States
Brunswick, Georgia
Brunswick County, Virginia
Rabbit dishes
History of American cuisine
Wild game dishes
Chicken soups
Legume dishes
Maize dishes
Okra dishes
North Carolina cuisine
Virginia cuisine
Culture in Braunschweig